The 173rd Brigade Support Battalion (Airborne) is a subordinate unit of the 173rd Infantry Brigade Combat Team (Airborne) in the United States Army based in Vicenza, Italy.

Organization
The 173rd Brigade Support Battalion (Airborne) serves to support the 173rd Infantry Brigade Combat Team (Airborne). The battalion currently consists of 475 soldiers in a headquarters and headquarters company (HHC), a supply company, maintenance company, medical company, parachute rigging company, and an aerial delivery detachment. Five additional forward support companies are detached in support of the Brigade's other subordinate units.

Brigade Support Battalion
Headquarters and headquarters Company (HHC) - Vanguard
A Company - Wildcard
B Company - Bandits
C Company - Lifeline
601st Quartermaster Company (Aerial Delivery) - Pack Mules
744th Quartermaster Detachment (Brigade Parachute Office)

Forward Support Companies
D Troop - Darkhorse (in support of 1-91 Cavalry Squadron)
E Company - Spartan (in support of 54th Brigade Engineer Battalion)
F Battery - Fury (in support of 4-319th Airborne Field Artillery Regiment)
G Company - Gamble (in support of 1st Battalion, 503rd Parachute Infantry Regiment
H Company - Hound (in support of 2nd Battalion, 503rd Parachute Infantry Regiment)

History of the 173rd Brigade Support Battalion (Airborne)
The 173rd Support Battalion was constituted on 26 March 1963 in the Regular Army and assigned to the 173rd Airborne Brigade.  Officially activated on 25 June 1963 in Okinawa, the Support Battalion participated and logistically supported hundreds of Brigade operations in a dozen different countries in the Pacific. In May 1965, the Support Battalion was sent to Vietnam with the Brigade.  For its time in Southeast Asia, the 173rd Support Battalion is recognized as having participated in 15 separate campaigns in Vietnam.  The Battalion received a Presidential Unit Citation, two Meritorious Unit Commendations, and a Republic of Vietnam Cross of Gallantry with palm streamer and a Republic of Vietnam Civil Action Honor Medal.  On 14 January 1972, the Support Battalion was relieved from assignment to the 173rd Airborne Brigade and subsequently deactivated.

In July 2004, LTC Cynthia L. Fox was tasked to quickly combine the Headquarters and Headquarters Company, 51st Maintenance Battalion located in Mannheim Germany and 501st Forward Support Company & Headquarters located in Vicenza Italy to begin the activation of the 173rd Support Battalion, achieved on 16 March 2005.  Eight days later, the 173rd Support Battalion deployed to Kandahar, Afghanistan to provide combat service support to Combined Task Force Bayonet.  The Battalion redeployed on 24 February 2006 after spending twelve months supporting combat operations in southern Afghanistan.

As a part of the 173rd Airborne Brigade's transformation, the 173rd Support Battalion transitioned into a Brigade Support Battalion (BSB) and moved to Bamberg, Germany on 16 September 2006 to begin training for their deployment to Afghanistan. On 17 May 2007, the newly transformed 173rd BSB (Airborne) deployed to Bagram and Jalalabad Airfields in northeastern Afghanistan.  The Battalion redeployed on 4 August 2008 after spending 15 months supporting combat operations throughout Regional Command East in Afghanistan.

On 22 February 2009, the Battalion was notified of a change to their deployment from Operation Iraqi Freedom to Operation Enduring Freedom.  In November 2009, the Sky Soldiers of the 173rd BSB were deployed to Forward Operating Base Shank, Logar, Afghanistan in support of Operation Enduring Freedom X and The Global War on Terrorism.  The unit performed its mission of manning, arming, fueling, fixing, moving and sustaining over 10,000 Soldiers, Sailors, Airmen, Marines, civilian contractors, and other government agencies throughout Logar and Wardak provinces of Regional Command-East (RC East), Afghanistan.  The Battalion redeployed from combat operations in November 2010.

In July 2013, the 173rd BSB deployed for a fourth time since its 2005 reactivation.  This time, BSB Paratroopers deployed from Bamberg, Germany as part of Task Force Repel, back to Afghanistan and Regional Command – East, as a subordinate element of Task Force Bayonet conducting Security Force Assistance and Training (SFAT) Operations in support of Operation Enduring Freedom XIII.  The Battalion aligned a forward logistics element in Wardak Province, Afghanistan and the remainder of the battalion at Forward Operating Base Shank, Logar Province Afghanistan, where they executed the difficult task of reducing the footprint of the Brigade and retrograding critical military material while continuing to train their Afghan counterparts.

The Battalion redeployed from combat operations in March 2013 and immediately began preparations to relocate from Bamberg, Germany to Vicenza, Italy to the newly completed Caserma Del Din where the Sky Soldiers of the 173rd BSB continue the distinction of honored service dating back to Vietnam and proudly represent the Airborne fighting spirit wherever they serve.

Constituted 26 March 1963 in the Regular Army as the 173rd Support Battalion, and assigned to the 173rd Airborne Brigade
Activated 25 June 1963 on Okinawa
Relieved 14 January 1972 from assignment to the 173rd Airborne Brigade
Inactivated 21 October 1972 at Fort Campbell, Kentucky
Activated 16 March 2005 in Vicenza, Italy
Deployed to Afghanistan From March 2005 to March 2006
On 17 September 2007 the unit was activated as a Brigade Support Battalion and relocated to Bamberg, Germany
Deployed to Afghanistan for a second time from May 2007 to August 2008
Deployed to Afghanistan for a third time from November 2009 to November 2010
Deployed to Afghanistan for a fourth time from July 2012 to March 2013
During July & August 2013, relocated from Bamberg, Germany to Vicenza, Italy

Honors

Unit decorations

Forward Support Company Unit decorations

External links
The Official Homepage of the 173rd Brigade Support Battalion (Airborne)
The Official Facebook Page
173rd Infantry Brigade Combat Team (Airborne) Official Website
173rd Airborne Brigade Association Website

References

SUP 0173
Airborne units and formations of the United States Army
Military units and formations established in 1963
Military units and formations of the United States Army in the Vietnam War